Ditzel is a German surname. Notable people with the surname include:

Filip Ditzel (born 1985), Czech track cyclist
Nanna Ditzel (1923–2005), Danish furniture designer

German-language surnames